Primaticcio is a station on Line 1 of the Milan Metro in Milan, Italy. The station is underground and is located on Via Francesco Primaticcio, within the municipal area of Milan.

History 
The station was opened on 18 April 1975 as part of the section between Gambara and Inganni. Primaticcio is part of the trunk Pagano-Bisceglie.

References

Line 1 (Milan Metro) stations
Railway stations opened in 1975
1975 establishments in Italy
Railway stations in Italy opened in the 20th century